Margaret Lake is located in Kittitas County, Washington. The lake is a popular area for hiking. It's also stocked with rainbow trout.

Name
Along with neighboring peaks and lakes, Margaret Lake was given its name by Albert Hale Sylvester, a topographer for the United States Geological Survey working throughout the North Cascades National Park Complex in the 1900s. The name is purported to be from the name of a sister of ranger Burne Canby who accompanied Sylvester on his camping trips.

See also
 List of lakes of the Alpine Lakes Wilderness

References

External links
 

Lakes of Washington (state)
Lakes of Kittitas County, Washington